Sun and Shadow may refer to:

"Sun and Shadow" (short story), by Ray Bradbury, 1953
Sun and Shadow, a novel by Åke Edwardson